= Danish Government Scholarship =

Financial aid program in Denmark

Danish Government Scholarship is an award of financial aid for foreign applicants coming to Denmark.

== Eligible countries ==
- Brazil
- China
- Japan
- Egypt
- South Korea
- Russia
